Cushing Falls, is a waterfall located south of Seufert County park on the shore of the Columbia River, just east of Dalles, in Wasco County, in the U.S. state of Oregon. It totals 8 feet waterfall along the course of Fifteenmile Creek surrounded by a dryer natural environment than the western flank of the Columbia Gorge.

Location 
The waters of the Fifteenmile Creek and Cushing Falls as well as Petersburg Falls further upstream, are located at a point where the Rain Shadow effect downside of the Columbia Gorge. The trail that leads to the waterfall spins off the left side of SE Frontage road.

See also 
 List of waterfalls in Oregon

References 

Waterfalls of Oregon
Parks in Wasco County, Oregon